La mosca d'oro  (The Fly Gold) is a 1921 Italian silent film directed by Riccardo Cassano and starring Eugenio Bandini, Myosa De Coudray and Fernanda Fassy.

External links
 

Italian silent feature films
1921 films
Italian black-and-white films